MNF may refer to:

Music
Maata Näkyvissä Festival, Finland

Chemical elements
Manganese(III) fluoride, MnF2 and MnF4

Political organizations
Mizo National Front, Mizoram, India
Mizo National Front (Democratic), split from the Mizo National Front
Mwalimu Nyerere Foundation, Tanzania

Television shows
Monday Night Football, televised National Football League
Monday Night Football (Sky Sports), televised Premier League football

Places
Monongahela National Forest, West Virginia, US

Military
Multinational Force in Lebanon, an international peacekeeping force created in 1982
Multi-National Force – Iraq, MRF-I